John Brooks Slaughter (born 16 March 1934) is an American electrical engineer and former college president who served as the first African-American director of the National Science Foundation (NSF). His work focuses on development of computer algorithms for system optimization and discrete signal processing.

Early life and education

Slaughter was born in and grew up in Topeka, Kansas, and attended Topeka High School. After two years at Washburn University, Slaughter transferred and earned a B.S. in electrical engineering from Kansas State University in 1956, an M.S. in engineering from the University of California, Los Angeles in 1961, and a Ph.D. in engineering sciences from the University of California, San Diego in 1971.

Academic career
He took a civilian position at the United States Navy Electronics Laboratory in San Diego in 1960. He was appointed Director of the Applied Physics Laboratory of the University of Washington in 1975. He joined the NSF in 1977 as assistant director for Astronomics, Atmospherics, Earth and Ocean Sciences. From 1980 to 1982 he was Director of the NSF.

He was elected to membership in the National Academy of Engineering in 1982. From 1982 to 1988 Slaughter served as Chancellor of the University of Maryland, College Park, then served as President of Occidental College in Los Angeles from 1988 to 1999. In 1999 he was appointed Melbo Professor of Leadership in Education at the University of Southern California.

Awards and honors
Awarded the IEEE Founders Medal for 2022.
Mount Slaughter, one of the peaks of the Sentinel Range of the Ellsworth Mountains in Antarctica

References

Further reading
Kessler, J., Kidd, J. Kidd R. & Morin, K. (1996). Distinguished African American Scientists of the 20th Century. Phoenix, AZ: Oryx Press. pp. 292–296.

External links
John Brooks Slaughter profile via The Faces of Science: African Americans in the Sciences.

1934 births
Living people
People from Topeka, Kansas
Washburn University alumni
Kansas State University alumni
UCLA Henry Samueli School of Engineering and Applied Science alumni
University of California, San Diego alumni
University of Washington faculty
Presidents of the University of Maryland, College Park
Presidents of Occidental College
University of Southern California faculty
United States National Science Foundation officials
Electrical engineering academics
American electrical engineers
African-American academics
United States Navy civilians
Members of the United States National Academy of Engineering
Engineers from California
Reagan administration personnel
Carter administration personnel